The Macleay Museum at The University of Sydney, was a natural history museum located on the University's  campus, in Sydney, New South Wales, Australia. The Museum was amalgamanted into Chau Chak Wing Museum, which opened in 2020.

The Macleay Museum was added to the City of Sydney local government heritage list on 14 December 2012.

History 
The Edgeworth David building in which the museum is housed was built off Science Lane within the Camperdown campus in 1887. The collections of the Macleay Museum are based largely on the efforts and acquisitions of the Macleay family, one of the pre-eminent families in colonial Sydney including Alexander Macleay, William Sharp Macleay and William John Macleay. The zoologist and collector George Masters served as curator until 1912.

Collection 
The strengths of the collection, now part of the Sydney University Museums, were in entomology, ethnography, scientific instruments, and historic photographs. Many of the biological specimens in the collection represented rare or extinct species, while some of the specimens have historic and cultural value as they were collected by explorers like Charles Darwin and Nicholas Miklouho-Maclay.

The George Masters Exhibition Space of the museum was devoted to temporary exhibitions. Overall, the museum house one of the most important natural history and ethnography collections in Australia, surpassed in Sydney only by the Australian Museum.

Gallery

See also 

 List of museums in Sydney
 Nicholson Museum

References

External links 

 

University of Sydney buildings
Museums in Sydney
Natural history museums in Australia
Buildings and structures completed in 1887
University museums in Australia
1887 establishments in Australia
George Allen Mansfield buildings
Museums established in 1887
2016 disestablishments in Australia
Defunct museums in Australia
Museums disestablished in 2016
Macleay family